Bznuniq was one of the 16 cantons of the Armenian historic region of Turuberan. It was located to the northeast of Lake Van. The canton was later known as Khelat. It was ruled by the Bznuni family.

See also
List of regions of old Armenia

Former regions of Armenia